Kai Naattu is a 1988 Indian Tamil-language film directed by V.C.Guhanathan and produced by D. Ramanaidu, starring Raghuvaran in lead role, supported by Shantipriya and Mucherla Aruna.

Plot 

Kai Naattu is the story of a goonda who always stands for justice. He had his dreams to have a peaceful life, but society turned him a goonda. His only pleasant memories are the time spent with his lady love.

Cast 
Raghuvaran
Shantipriya
Mucherla Aruna
Senthil
Sudhakar
Charle
Madhuri
Thilak

Soundtrack 
Soundtrack was composed by Chandrabose.
"Kovaila" – Malaysia Vasudevan
"Oorengum Unnai" – Jayachandran, Vani Jairam
"Podu Podu" – Malaysia Vasudevan
"Moottaipoochi" – Malaysia Vasudevan, Soundararajan
"Ada Nee" – Malaysia Vasudevan, S. P. Sailaja

References 

1980s Tamil-language films
1988 action films
1988 films
Films directed by V. C. Guhanathan
Films scored by Chandrabose (composer)
Indian action films
Suresh Productions films